Parachromis dovii, the guapote, rainbow bass, or wolf cichlid, is a species of cichlid native to Central America where it occurs in lakes, rivers and streams in Honduras, Nicaragua and Costa Rica. A strongly predatory species, it mostly feeds on other fish. P. dovii is important to local commercial fisheries, sought after as a gamefish, and sometimes kept in aquariums.

Etymology
The fish is named in honor of John Melmoth Dow (1827-1892) of the Panama Railroad Company. As a ship captain and amateur naturalist, he collected the type specimen.

As pets 
Parachromis dovii is sometimes sought after by well experienced aquarists. While they are noted for their relatively high intelligence and lifespan of up to a few decades, they require special care due to their large size and high levels of aggression even by cichlid standards, meaning that few–if any–tank mates are possible.

Conservation 
Parachromis dovii is widespread in its native range and generally common. Although it has declined locally due to overfishing and pollution, it is not considered threatened. It occurs in Costa Rica's Maquenque National Wildlife Refuge. The species has been introduced to some locations in Central America where not native.

References

External links 

dovii
Fish described in 1864
Fish of Nicaragua
Taxa named by Albert Günther